Shakib Khan born 28 March 1979) is a Bangladeshi actor, producer, occasional singer, film organiser, and media personality who works in Bengali films, both in Bangladesh and West Bengal. In his career spanning about two decades, Khan has been the propeller of the contemporary film industry Dhallywood. Currently he is the highest paid actor in Bangladesh.

Following his debut in Sohanur Rahman Sohan's 1999 action romantic Ananta Bhalobasha (Eternal Love), Khan did not lead to widespread fame. Subsequently, Khan established himself as one of the most successful actors in Bengali cinema. The Badiul Alam Khokon-directed Priya Amar Priya (2008) in which Khan played a college student with careless attitude, was a major commercial success in his career. His Shikaris new look garnered him praised from the audience and critics and was declared as a blockbuster at the box office, and become the highest-grossing Bengali film of 2016. His 2017 success is Swatta and Nabab. Where Swatta won numerous accolades including five National Film Awards, six Bachsas Awards, two Meril-Prothom Alo Awards and earned him fourth National Film Awards for Best Actor and Nabab in which he played an intelligence agent from Bangladesh. His energetic performance and re-emergence in the film was praised by both critics and audiences. In 2019 Khan was paid-up 5 million for the film Nolok and become the highest-paid entertainers in the history of Bangladesh.

His other notable films are drama film Shuva (2006), where he played a village boy and earned him highly praised from critics, romantic film such Amar Praner Swami (2007) and Bolbo Kotha Bashor Ghore (2009) earned him highest accolades, romantic-comedy Adorer Jamai (2011), action-romantic Don Number One (2012), political thriller Rajneeti (2017), which is highly considers the politics of Bangladesh and created controversy with Khan used a phone number in the film that eventually turned out to be that of a rickshaw driver. That driver later sued him for $60,000 (£45,000) stating that the use of his number let millions to call to his number searching for Shakib Khan (See Controversy section for further details). Romantic action films such Bhaijaan Elo Re (2018), Chalbaaz (2018) and supernatural-thiller Naqaab (2018) earned him worldwide recognition, political thriller Bir (2020) and legal drama Nabab LLB (2021), where he played an advocate and becoming the first Dhallywood film to released any OTT platform. In 2011, he made his debut as a playback singer in the film of Moner Jala. In 2014, he made his debut as a producer with the film Hero: The Superstar and subsequently produced films like Password (2019), Bir (2020).

Khan has earned numerous accolades in his long career, including four National Film Awards, eight Meril Prothom Alo Awards, three Bachsas Awards and five CJFB Performance Awards. He won his first National Film Awards for Best Actor in 2010 for the film Bhalobaslei Ghor Bandha Jay Na, where he played as Surja Khan, an independent young man who studied law. His second National Film Award for his portrayal of a boy who deeply love his mother and got separated from his mother when he was quite young in Shahin-Sumon duo's Khodar Pore Ma (2012). He was noted for his performances in SA Haque Alik's romance film Aro Bhalobashbo Tomay (2015) and Hashibur Reza Kallol's romance drama film Swatta (2017) and also won third and fourth National Film Award respectively.

Early life
Shakib Khan was born on 28 March 1979 as Masud Rana in Ragadhi, Muksudpur, Gopalganj, Bangladesh. Khan's original residence is Maksudpur Upazila of Gopalganj district. His father Abdur Rab was a government officer and his mother Nurjahan is a housewife. The other members of his family are a sister and a brother. He grew up as a teenager in Narayanganj district due to his father's job. His father's job required the family to relocate frequently from one city to another during his school years. In many interviews he said that he did not mind travelling and changing schools. During his ninth grade, when he was residing with his family in Narayanganj, he became interested in Martial arts. After that he has done a course in Martial arts. In his childhood he dreamt to become a doctor or engineer. He was a bright student and did brilliant results in Secondary School Certificate (SSC) and Higher Secondary School Certificate (HSC) exams but discontinued his study after getting chance to act in films. Besides education, he also had an interest in dancing. Khan met film choreographer and actor Aziz Reza in 1995, and then completed a dancing course under Aziz Reza. In 1998, one day he went to Bangladesh Film Development Corporation (BFDC), the only major studio of Bangladesh on a random visit with Aziz Reza, where he met a photographer who asked him to take part in a photoshoot. During the photoshoot, film director Abul Khair Bulbul noticed Khan and offered him to play lead role in his film and he accept the offered. Although eventually the production of the film did not began. Later he get an offer for Rafiqul Islam's 1998 romantic project Sobai to Shukhi Hote Chay directed by Aftab Khan Tulu. Khan accepted the offer and first time stand on camera. The film was delayed being release, which was later released in the following year. At that time, director Sohanur Rahman Sohan was looking for a new hero due to a dispute with actor Shakil Khan. In two deferent interviews with Kaler Kantho and Chiti Aziz Reza said that he very much requested Sohanur Rahman Sohan to give a chance Shakib Khan in his film. Sohan agreed to his request and asked to bring Shakib Khan to their office. Sohan then gave him a chance as a lead actor for his upcoming project and later made his debut with Ananta Bhalobasha (1999) directed by Sohanur Rahman Sohan. He was paid only 5,000 for those initial films.

Shakib Khan said about his wish,

Career

1999–2005 

Shakib Khan was first contracted sign in the film Sobaito Sukhi Hote Chay (Everyone Wants To Be Happy), he was first to stand in front of the camera with this film, which was directed by Aftab Khan Tulu, another newcomer Karisma Sheikh played opposite him. Although Khan's debut film was Ananta Bhalobasha (Eternal Love) directed by Sohanur Rahman Sohan, which was released on 28 May 1999. Erin Zaman, the younger sister of veteran Bangladeshi actress Moushumi, played opposite him in the film, and it has become notable as the debut film of both. Although the film was not very successful but Khan as a hero caught the attention of everyone. In the second year of his acting career, he appeared in the film Golam (2000) opposite then the top actress Shabnur directed by Ispahani-Arif Jahan duo. On this year, he starred opposite Purnima in the film Ajker Dapot directed by AJ Rana, Dujon Dujonar opposite Popy directed by Abu Saeed Khan, and Bishe Bhora Nagin opposite Munmun directed by Delwar Jahan Jhantu.

In 2001 several films released by him including Shikari, Shopner Bashor, Mayer Jehad, Rangga Mastan, Hingshar Poton and Bondhu Jokhon Shatru. Shopner Bashor directed by FI Manik, along with Riaz and Shabnur his performance also praised by the critics and audience in the film. In 2002 a number of films released by him including Ful Nebo Naa Ostro Nebo and Strir Morjada ditected by FI Manik, O Priya Tumi Kothay directed by Shahadat Hossain Liton, Nachnewali by Zillur Rahman and Bishwa Batpar by Badal Khandaker. In the film Strir Morjada he first time ever appear opposite Moushumi.

In 2003, he starred in Sahoshi Manush Chai, Praner Manush, Kkhmotar Dapot and Sobar Upore Prem. The film Sahoshi Manush Chai directed by Muhammad Hannan, which was highly acclaimed by the critics and audience and won the National Film Awards in two categories.

In 2004, he starred in Noyon Bhora Jol, Ajker Somaj, Bostir Rani Suriya and Rukhe Darao. On Eid al-Fitr of this year he starred in Monwar Hossain Khokon's biographical crime thriller film Khuni Shikder. The film is based on the biography of the Bangladeshi notorious murderer Ershad Sikder. In which he played as Shahjahan Shikder, who became a psycho after the death of his mother and then started killing one after another and subsequently he became the country's top terrorist and serial killer. Although the film has been criticised at various times for its obscenity, but also has been widely acclaimed as one of the best performances of his career.

In 2005, he starred in City Terror directed by MA Rahim, where he first time performed with veteran actor Manna. He also starred with Riaz and Purnima in the film of Badha directed by Shahin–Sumon.

2006–2010 
In 2006 thirteen of his films were released and all of the films were commercially success at the box office and as well as become best-selling films of the year. As a result of this success, his salary increased from three lakhs to six-seven lakhs. He played opposite Purnima in Shuva directed by Chashi Nazrul Islam, based on the short story Shuva by Biswakabi Rabindranath Tagore. For the film he was nominated in the Lux-Channel I Performance Awards for Best Film Actor in both of people choice and the critics choice category in 2007. In same year a number of films released by him including Koti Takar Kabin, Pitar Ason, Dadima, and Chachchu directed by FI Manik and Mayer Morjada directed by Dilip Biswas. In the film of Koti Takar Kabin he first time starred opposite his former wife and co-artist Apu Biswas. Khan first gained popularity through starring in Chachchu.

In 2007, 12 films starring Khan were released. All of his film have been commercially successful at the box office and become best-selling of the year as like previous year. He starred in PA Kajal's project Amar Praner Swami. The film super-hit at the box office and became the highest grossing Bangladeshi film of 2007. For the film Khan earned his first Meril Prothom Alo Awards for Best Actor. After the success of the film at the box office, his salary increased to 12 lakhs. In the same year he also starred in Kabinnama, Jomoj, Swamir Shongshar, Doctor's House, Tui Jodi Amar Hoiti Re, Kotha Dao Saathi Hobe, Danob Shontan, Kopal, Ma Amar Shorgo, Kothin Prem and Ek Buk Jala.

In 2008, he starred in Tomake Bou Banabo, Amar Jaan Amar Pran, Shomadhi, Ek Takar Bou, Bhalobashar Dushman, Priya Amar Priya, Tip Tip Brishti, Tumi Swapno Tumi Shadhona, Amader Choto Saheb, Shontan Amar Ohongkar, Jodi Bou Sajo Go and Mone Prane Acho Tumi. He starred in Badiul Alam Khokon's romantic action comedy film Priya Amar Priya as Hridoy, a college student with careless attitude opposite Sahara. Khan's dialogue and the use of the phrase "সিটিতে অনেক কমিশনার আসবে যাবে কিন্তু হৃদয় এখানেই থাকবে। আমি এখানকার লোকাল... লো..ক্কাল।" (Many commissioners will come and go in the city but Hridoy will stay here. I'm local here... lo..ccal) were popular with audiences. He won numerous awards including Meril Prothom Alo Awards, Lux-Channel I Performance Awards and CJFB Performance Awards for Best Actor. The film all-time blockbuster at the box office with grossed 150 million at the box office, which is the second-highest grossing in the history of Bangladeshi cinema. Shabnur and Rumana Khan played opposite him in Ek Takar Bou directed by PA Kajal. The film won the National Film Awards and the Meril Prothom Alo Awards in a category. He also won Bachsas Awards by starring in Jodi Bou Sajo Go opposite Apu Biswas directed by FI Manik.

In 2009, he starred in Amar Praner Priya, Swami Strir Wada, Bhalobasha Dibi Kina Bol, Mon Jekhane Hridoy Sekhane, Bolona Kobul, Biyer Prostab, Jonmo Tomar Jonno, Prem Koyedi, Saheb Name Golam, O Sathii Re and Sobar Upore Tumi. Sobar Upore Tumi directed by FI Manik, where he performed for the first time in the Indo-Bangladesh joint production. It was for the first time that Indian actress Swastika Mukherjee was seen opposite him. The film was released in West Bengal, India the following year as the title of Amar Bhai Amar Bon. Almost seven years later, on 6 March 2017, the film was released in Hindi version as Hello Zindagi under the banner of Angel Digital. On this year, Swami Strir Wada directed by PA Kajal was praised by the audience and the critics and won the National Film Awards in three categories. He starred in Amar Praner Priya opposite Bidya Sinha Saha Mim directed by Jakir Hossain Raju and become a box-office success in Bangladesh, primarily noted for its soundtrack & choreography. The film all the song were popular and become hit with audience as well song "Ki Jadu Korecho Bolona" was on the hit song listed for a year. It won a National Film Awards and nominated numerous categories in Meril Prothom Alo Awards including his Best Actor nomination as well as earned him CJFB Performance Awards.

The following year, in 2010 he starred in Bolona Tumi Amar, Prem Mane Naa Badha, Top Hero, Poran Jai Jolia Re, Bhalobaslei Ghor Bandha Jay Na, Takar Cheye Prem Boro, Jibon Moroner Saathi, Preme Porechi, Chehara: Vondo–2, Premik Purush, Jibon Moroner Saathi directed by Shahadat Hossain Liton and Hay Prem Hay Bhalobasha. He played the role of Surjo, an independent young man in the romantic revenge film Bhalobaslei Ghor Bandha Jay Na directed by Zakir Hossain Raju opposite Apu Biswas and Rumana Khan. The film was highly successful, critically and commercially and become the second highest-grossing film of 2010 after Number One Shakib Khan. It won numerous accolades including seven National Film Awards, five Bachsas Awards and two Meril Prothom Alo Awards as well as a nomination and Khan was awarded Meril Prothom Alo Awards and National Film Awards for the first time. In this year in Eid-al Fitr, he also starred in Number One Shakib Khan, Chachchu Amar Chachchu and Nissash Amar Tumi. The film Number One Shakib Khan directed by Badiul Alam Khokon, gained commercially success at the box office and widespread popularity. He won numerous accolades for the film including Binodon Bichitra Awards 2010, Uro-CJFB Performance Awards 2010, Walton Boishakhi Star Awards 2011 and Babisas Awards 2010. In Chachchu Amar Chachchu directed by PA Kajal played as Chachchu (trans. Uncle) opposite Parthana Fardin Dighi as niece and Dighi earned National Award and Nissash Amar Tumi directed by Badiul Alam Khokon was a hit at the box-office and was one of the highest grossing of 2010. It won twice National Film Awards. in all three films Apu Biswas starring opposite him. All the three films received National Film Awards in various categories.

2011–2015 
In 2011, Khan starred in Koti Takar Prem directed by Sohanur Rahman Sohan. In Moner Jala directed by Malek Afsari starring Apu Biswas opposite him, he also sung a song in the film for the first time as a playback singer titled "Ami Chok Tule Takalei Surjo Lukay". King Khan directed by Mohammad Hussain Jammy starring Apu Biswas and Lamia Mimo opposite him, it is becoming the most successful film in the year and he won Meril Prothom Alo Awards and CJFB Performance Awards for Best Actor. He was nominated for the Best Actor in critics choice category at the Meril Prothom Alo Awards through starring in comedy-drama film Adorer Jamai opposite Apu Biswas directed by Shahadat Hossain Liton. In Eid al-fitr of the year, he starred in Tiger Number One directed by Shahin-Sumon and has played for the first time as negative role. According to Orchi Othondrila, mainstream Bangladeshi films are "always based on a central hero while female characters are there as objects to complement [the] hero's actions." She wrote that, as with many other Shakib Khan film titles, the title Tiger Number One implies "that the stories are solely depended on the hero who is the centre of the actions." Boss Number One directed by Mohammad Hossain and Matir Thikana directed by Shah Alam Kiran won the National Film Awards and the Meril Prothom Alo Awards in various categories through starring by him. In this year, he also appeared in a guest role in the film of Ke Apon Ke Por directed by Shahin–Sumon.

In 2012, he starred in Se Amar Mon Kereche, Buk Fatey To Mukh Foteyna, Ek Takar Denmohor, My Name Is Sultan, Don Number One, Khodar Pore Ma and Dhakar King. He won Meril Prothom Alo Awards for Best Actor in critics choice category through starring in Don Number One directed by Badiul Alam Khokon opposite Shahara in 2013, which is the remake of Telugu language film Don (2007) directed by Raghava Lawrence, starring himself along with Nagarjuna and Anushka Shetty. In 100% Love: Buk Fatey To Mukh Futeyna he starred opposite Apu Biswas and Rumana Khan, which is a remake of 2010 Telugu film Brindavanam directed by Vamsi Paidipally starring NTR Jr., Kajal Agarwal and Samantha Ruth Prabhu. The film opened very well at the box office and was declared a super-hit and become one of the highest-grossing films of 2012. He also starred in Khodar Pore Ma opposite Shahara directed by Shahin–Sumon duo, and played as the role of Munna and veteran actress Bobita also played as the role of his mother. The film received positive reviews and declared as a super-hit and become the highest-grossing film of 2012 and received several National Film Awards including his second National Award for Best Actor at the 37th National Film Awards in 2014 for his performance in the film. Besides in this year, Khan, who holds a record number of remuneration, made the latest surprise by being elected president of the Bangladesh Film Artists Association.

In the beginning of the following year, he starred in romantic drama film Devdas, which is based on the famous novel Devdas, written by the untouchable novelist Sharat Chandra Chattopadhyay. The film is set in the early 1900s and follows Khan as Devdas Mukherjee, a wealthy law graduate who returns from Calcutta after 13 years to marry his childhood sweetheart, Paro, played by Apu Biswas. However, the rejection of this marriage by his own family sparks his descent into alcoholism, ultimately leading to his emotional deterioration and him seeking refuge with a courtesan, Chandramukhi, played by Moushumi. The film directed by veteran director Chashi Nazrul Islam and remade of the same director's film Devdas in 1982. It received positive response from critics and a good opening at the box office, and won several awards in 38th National Film Awards and nominated one category in 16th Meril-Prothom Alo Awards. Then Purnima played opposite him in Judge Barrister Police Commissioner directed by FI Manik. After 35 years the three Bangladeshi popular stars Razzak, Sohel Rana and Alamgir played with together in the film. It is also becoming success at the box office and praised by the critics. He also played titular role in Nishpap Munna, directed by Badiul Alam Khokon. The film was received mixed reviews and earn huge success in box office. Then he work with same director's romantic action film My Name Is Khan opposite Apu Biswas. The film also received mixed reviews from critics. Despite this, the film become commercially success at the box office and becoming one of the highest-grossing film of 2013 in Bangladesh. In the same year, Mahiya Mahi starring opposite him in the film Bhalobasha Aaj Kal directed by PA Kajal. It was the first collaboration between Khan and Jaaz Multimedia and between Khan and Mahiya Mahi. The film received mostly positive reviews from critics and declared as a superhit at the box office, and was also highest-grossing film of Jaaz Multimedia production until Shikari (2016) released. In mid of the year, he starred in Dhaka to Bombay directed by Uttam Akash. The film released to negative reviews and failed at the box office. In the end of the year, he starred in romantic action film Purno Doirgho Prem Kahini directed by Shafi Uddin Shafi, Jaya Ahsan and Arifin Shuvoo performed opposite him. He sung a song for the second time in the film as a playback singer titled "O Priyo Ami Tumar Hote Chai". The film opened to major critical success and earned numerous accolades. It received six Meril Prothom Alo Awards nominations, with Khan winning Best Actor for his portrait as Joy Shikder and Ahsan winning Best Actress. The film had the longest theatrical run in 2013, completing over 100 days at the box office. The film was a blockbuster at the box office and becoming one of the highest-grossing film of 2013. After the film's commercially success, a sequel titled Purno Doirgho Prem Kahini 2 released in 2016. He starred in Malek Afsari's 22nd project crime thriller Full and Final as IPS Romeo opposite Bobby Hoque, collaboration between first time. The film well performed at the box office and become super hit and received mixed reviews from critics. Zia Nazmul Islam of The Daily Star claimed that, "Shakib Khan plays his role with his usual Shakib-style. He couldn't bring anything new to the table." He also noted, "Considering all factors, Full and Final is made to benefit from Shakib Khan's popularity and Bobby's attractiveness." He also starred in an ensemble cast venture Rakibul Islam Rakib's romantic drama Premik Number One. The film released to positive reviews and performed well at the box office. Adnan Ahmed wrote in The Daily Star that, "Once again we see Shakib Khan donning the charming lover boy character, he has made the genre his own".

In the beginning of 2014, he starred in Iftekhar Chowdhury’s Rajotto, opposite Bobby Hoque. It was the first collaboration between Khan and Iftekhar Chowdhury. The film turned out be hit and received critically positive reviews and his performance was highly praised by the critics. Syed Nazmus Sakib of Bangla Movie Database claimed that "He has dragged the whole film alone." He also noted, "There are so many flaws and deviations in the whole film - it can be forgiven only because of the performance of one person - he is Shakib Khan." He performed in Badiul Alam Khokon's Daring Lover as Raja. The film remade of 2006 Boopathy Pandian's comedy-drama film Thiruvilaiyaadal Aarambam. The film received massive response and is said to contribute to record breaking sales in some renowned theaters. Then he founded his own production company SK Films and produced the film of Hero: The Superstar directed by Badiul Alam Khokon under the banner of his company, where he played dual roles and Apu Biswas, Bobby, Bobita and Nuton played with him. The film was released in 120 theatres on the occasion of Eid al-Fitr, which was a record number at the time. It achieved huge commercial success at the box office. The film received positive reviews from critics and his performance also praised by the critics. Abdullah Al Amin (Rubel) of The Daily Star noted that "Shakib Khan has done yet another great job in upholding his character in the movie. Hero the Superstar is all about the Hero himself, Shakib khan. He portrayed both characters perfectly. For the film he was won the Meril Prothom Alo Awards for Best Actor in 2015. He starred in Wajed Ali Sumon's project Hitman. The film received mixed reviews and face various criticism. Other films he starred in were Faand - The Trap directed by Shafi Uddin Shafi, Shera Nayok directed by Wakil Ahmed, Kothin Protishod directed by Nazrul Islam Khan, and Bhalobasha Express directed by Shafi Uddin Shafi. He also played a guest role in Ek Cup Cha produced by actor Ferdous Ahmed and Dobir Saheber Songsar directed by Zakir Hossain Raju.

In 2015, he starred in Sohail Arman's first project romantic war-based drama film This Is Love: Eito Prem opposite Afsana Ara Bindu for the first time. The film performed well in box office and received mixed reviews from critics. He was nominated in the Meril Prothom Alo Awards for Best Actor in 2016. He starred in Aro Bhalobashbo Tomay directed by SA Haque Alik opposite Pori Moni and won the National Film Awards for Best Actor for the third time in his career for his role in the film as himself. It received positive reviews from critics, and considering its budget the film had commercial success at the box office. His next project FI Manik's Dui Prithibi was released before Eid al-Fitr of this year. In Eid al-Fitr of the year, he starred in Shahin Sumon's project Love Marriage. The film open to a good at box office and received positive reviews from and his performance, especially his Dakaiya accent is highly praised by the critics. Mohaiminul Islam of The Daily Star noted that, "The movie is a solid source of entertainment with Shakib Khan adorned in “traditional” white Punjabi, lungi and his flawless Dhakaiya accent. His talent as an actor shines through, despite the absurdity of some sequences like using a helicopter to travel to Shyamoli from Old Dhaka." Tanvir Tareq also noted on The Daily Ittefaq "Especially after the entry of Shakib Khan, the way in which he has been performing impeccably in pure Dhaka accent, his performance is to be commended." His next project romantic action film Rajababu: The Power directed by Badiul Alam Khokon was released in Eid al-Adha. Where he played as titular role opposite Apu Biswas and Bobby. The film was released in more than 152 theaters, which was a record number for any Bangladeshi film at that time. The film was successful at the box office and has received critical acclaimed.

2016–2020 
At the beginning of 2016, Raja 420 directed by Uttam Akash released starring by him. He played titular role in this comedy film, where Apu Biswas and Ravina Brishti have played opposite him. Then in April, he starred in পূর্ণদৈর্ঘ্য প্রেম কাহিনী (Full-length Love Story 2) directed by Shafi Uddin Shafi, whice is the sequel of 2013's film পূর্ণদৈর্ঘ্য প্রেম কাহিনী (Full-length Love Story), where Khan played as a cricketer for the first time in his acting career. Mamnun Hasan Emon, Jaya Ahsan and Moushumi Hamid has played with him in the film, which is based on the conflict of two cricketers. The film received positive reviews from critics, and also commercially success at the box office, which was declared as a super hit at the box office. It is one of the highest grossing Bangladeshi films of the year in 2016. On the same year in Eid al-Fitr শিকারি (The Hunter), Mental and Samraat: The King Is Here released by him. The joint production শিকারি (The Hunter) directed by Bangladeshi Jakir Hossain Shimanto and Indian Joydip Mukherjee. He was praised with the first pairing of the film with Tollywood actress Srabanti Chatterjee, also seen with him actors like Sabyasachi Chakraborty, Rahul Dev and Kharaj Mukherjee. His new look in the film garnered praise from the audience and critics. It was declared as a blockbuster at the box office, and become the highest-grossing Bengali film of 2016. He won the Meril Prothom Alo Awards and the Tele Cine Awards for Best Actor through starring by film. The film also won the Kalakar Awards for Best Film and Best Actress, and nominated in a category at the Filmfare Awards East. His next project is psychological thriller film Mental directed by Shamim Ahamed Roni starring Nusrat Imrose Tisha first time opposite him, Achol and Sabrina Porshi also seen with his. It's story is loosely inspired from the Christopher Nolan's film Memento. Although the film is criticised for various reasons. The film was later dubbed in Hindi, which was unveiled on the Bongo India YouTube channel in mid-August 2021. His next project was crime thriller film Samraat: The King Is Here directed by Mohammad Mostafa Kamal Raz, he played titular role as the leader of a Bangladeshi organised crime syndicate operating from Malaysia, where he played with Apu Biswas, Misha Sawdagor and Indian actor Indraneil Sengupta. On the same year in Eid al-Adha, he starred in two films. One of which is Shamim Ahamed Roni's action film Bossgiri opposite Shabnom Bubly, which is her debut film. Zahid Akbar of The Daily Star praised his performance, specifically his Dhakaiya accent. He noted, "There were some highlights in the film such as Shakib Khan's delivery of the Dhakaiya accent, which was fairly entertaining. Shakib Khan's presence is the only saving grace in the entire film." The film won three awards in the 19th Meril Prothom Alo Awards. Another was Raju Chowdhury's action crime film Shooter. The film was a commercial success at the box office, placed among the top 10 commercially successful films of 2016 but received negative reviews from critics for its poor screenplay but praised his performance. Film director Mostafizur Rahman Manik noted on Bangla Tribune that, "Shakib Khan is as good as ever in terms of acting". In December of the same year, he starred in Dhumketu directed by Shafique Hasan opposite Pori Moni. Zahid Akbar has criticized his costume and hairstyles in the film. He noted, "Shakib Khan was not too bad. However, it was clear that he was shooting for a long time. There was no continuity in costume and haircut. He appeared in one scene with big hair, but in the next scene appeared in short hair, which has caused a lot of annoyance."

In the beginning of 2017, he starred in সত্তা (The Entity). The film directed by Hashibur Reza Kallol based on the story of fictionist Sohani Hossain's Maa (meaning Mother) and for the first time Indian actress Paoli Dam played opposite him. His performance in the film caught the attention of the audience of all the classes, the film also success at the box office. At Risingbd.com, Ruhul Amin appreciated that it was a good idea to start a story with a mainstream hero. He noted, "Sabuj means that Shakib Khan also made one of the best performances of his acting career in Swatta". However, he criticized Khan's early performance in the film. It won numerous accolades including five National Film Awards at the 42nd Bangladesh National Film Awards and Khan won the National Film Awards as Best Actor for the fourth time by playing as Sabuj, who is a drug-addicted pervert young son of rich man. On the same year in Eid al-Fitr Nabab and রাজনীতি (Politics) released starring by him. Indo-Bangladesh joint production Nabab directed by Joydeep Mukherjee and for the first time Indian actress Subhashree Ganguly played opposite him. The film released in 128 theatres, and become the highest-grossing films of 2017 and become one of the highest grossing Bangladeshi and West Bengal film of all time. His energetic performance and re-emergence in the film was praised by both critics and audiences. Film critic Zahid Akbar noted on The Daily Star, "From the beginning of the film to the end, Shakib has tried to pour all his talent. He was the Nawab throughout the whole story". His dialogue and the use of the phrase of the film "সন্ত্রাসের কোনো জাত নেই, দেশ নেই, ধর্ম নেই, ওদের পরিচয় একটাই, ওরা সন্ত্রাসবাদী।" (trans. There is no caste of terrorism, no country, no religion, their only identity is that they are terrorists.) were very popular with audiences. On the other, রাজনীতি (Politics) directed by Bulbul Biswas, after a long year he is seen opposite Apu Biswas. The film praised by the critics and the audience. Rayan Khan, the film critic of the Bangla Tribune, praised the film's direction, screenplay and performances by lead artists. However, he criticised Shakib Khan's two looks in the same film. He noted, "From the beginning to the end of the film he is unrivalled in acting. His eye expression is incomparable. Shakib Khan's look was not in continuity, even though the other actors of the film were look continuity". In Eid al-Adha, he starred in Rangbaaz and Ohongkar. Shabnom Bubly was the opposite in this twice films.

In the beginning of the following year, he starred in political drama film আমি নেতা হবো (I Want To Be Leader), where Bidya Sinha Saha Mim starred opposite him for the second time after the release of আমার প্রাণের প্রিয়া (My Beloved Dear). The film is co-produced by Eskay Movies with Shapla Media of Bangladesh. Then in April he starred in romantic comedy film Chalbaaz directed by Joydeep Mukherjee, which is the remake of 2015's Telugu language action comedy-drama film Subramanyam for Sale starring by Sai Dharam Tej and Regina Cassandra. It was first Indian solo production film starring by him, which was produced by Indian production company Eskay Movies. Subhashree Ganguly starred opposite him in the film, where he is seen with actors like Rajatava Dutta, Kharaj Mukherjee, Kazi Hayat and Ashish Vidyarthi. It received positive reviews from critics after its release. Anindo Mamun praised Shakib Khan's performance, especially his comedy. Mamun noted on Jugantor that, "Shakib Khan also tried to give the best. His comedy acting was also great. In return he is getting applause from the audience". In Eid al-Fitr of the year, Pangku Jamai, Chittagainga Poya Noakhakhailla Maiya and Super Hero and released by him. Comedy drama Pangku Jamai directed by Abdul Mannan, and Apu Biswas starring opposite him. Chittagainga Poya Noakhailla Maiya directed by Uttam Akash. The film also comedy drama, which is made in the regional languages of Chittagong and Noakhali. Then he starred in director Ashiqur Rahman's fifth project action-crime film Super Hero. He played as Iqbal Mahmud Sami, a special force officer. The film created many controversy for various reasons, from filming to release. His next venture is Indian action comedy-drama film Bhaijaan Elo Re, which was also directed by Joydeep Mukherjee. He has played dual roles opposite Srabanti Chatterjee and Payal Sarkar in the film. On the same year in Eid-ul-Adha, he starred in Captain Khan directed by Wajed Ali Sumon as the titular role. The film remake of Tamil language action thriller film Anjaan starring by Suriya and Samantha Ruth Prabhu. At the end of the year, he starred in Indian supernatural thriller film Naqaab of Shree Venkatesh Films, whice is directed by Rajiv Kumar Biswas. Where he played dual roles opposite Nusrat Jahan and Sayantika Banerjee.

In Eid al-Fitr of 2019, he starred in Password and Nolok. The film Password was released in highest number of theaters of the year. It was commercially success in spite of various criticisms, including accusations of plagiarism, theft of song lyrics, not giving time to other film promote. The film grossed 110 million on its fourth day at the box office, which is the fourth-highest grossing in the history of Bangladeshi cinema and become highest-grossing film of the year. The film won the highest number of awards including Best Popular Actor in the first Bharat-Bangladesh Film Awards held in Bangladesh. Romantic comedy-drama film Nolok directed by Sakib Sonnet and Team. He played as Shaon Talukder opposite Bobby. The film won in a category award at the Bharat-Bangladesh Film Awards and nominated in several categories. On the same year in Eid al-Adha he starred in Zakir Hossain Raju's 20th project Moner Moto Manush Pailam Naa, which was the seventh collaboration between Zakir Hossain Raju and him. In which he played as Shadhin, an independent lawyer, he played the role for the second time in his career. Earlier, he played Advocate Murad as a lawyer in Humkir Mukhe (হুমকির মুখে) directed by Aziz Ahmed Babul opposite actress Eka in 2003. The film performed average at the box office and received mixed reviews from critics upon release but Khan's performance in the film was highly praised by critics. Rumman Rashid Khan on Bangla Movie Database wrote that, he has done justice to his name. Rumman noted, "Shakib Khan has been able to do justice to his name in the film. Not with the body, he has performed in several scenes of the film with his eye expression. Shakib Khan's performance while talking to his parents about flashbacks has made me repeatedly wondered that why he is the best." It won several National Film Awards at the 44th National Film Awards including Zakir Hossain Raju's Best Dialogue Award.

In 2020, he starred in Bir and Shahenshah. Socio-political drama film Bir directed by veteran director Kazi Hayat. The film marks the first collaboration between Khan and Kazi Hayat. The film is produced by himself, which is his third production, he has previously produced two films titled Hero: The Superstar (2014) and Password (2019). The film story, dialogue and Khan's performance praised by the critics. Zahid Akbar noted on The Daily Star, "The audience has seen Bir to see Shakib Khan's performance. Throughout the film he has acted in heroic". Shahenshah directed by young director Shamim Ahamed Roni, where Nusraat Faria and Rodela Jannat played for the first time opposite him. Despite having set the release date several times, later the film was criticised for not releasing. The feature was theatrically released in Bangladesh amid the COVID-19 pandemic, which affected its commercial performance due to the closing of the cinemas. His next venture is Anonno Mamun's eighth directorial project legal drama Nabab LLB, which is the first collaboration between director, opposite second collaboration between Mahiya Mahi and first between Orchita Sporshia. The project began on 30 August 2020, after seven months from proposed date due to COVID-19 pandemic in Bangladesh. It was released on the Over-the-top media service iTheater due to the COVID-19 pandemic in Bangladesh, and became the first Dhallywood film to released any OTT service.

2021–present

Upcoming projects 
His several notable films are awaiting to release for various reasons. He started Shapla Media's upcoming project Bidrohi (formerly known as Ektu Prem Darkar) on 25 September 2018 and wrapped up in the mid-September 2019. The film got censor certificate in March 2020 without any cut. The film was then awaiting to release on Eid al-Fitr in 2020. The film was not released in theatres on time due to the COVID-19 pandemic in Bangladesh. It is currently awaiting to release. The film created controversy, with its producer sending a legal notice against him for not completing the work on time. (See Controversy section for further details) His another upcoming project is Badiul Alam Khokon's Agun, opposite Jahara Mitu in her debut. The film began on 5 August 2019, and second lot of the film was ended on 7 October 2019. After that, it is currently stopped due to the producer has been arrested for his involvement in casino activities in Bangladesh. Recently he completed work of Wajed Ali Sumon's project Antaratma, opposite Darshana Banik (in her Bangladeshi debut). The film began in March 2021 and filming was completed following month and the post-production will be completed in India. The film's director Wajed Ali Sumon told The Daily Star that, "The post-production of the film is taking place in India. If the (COVID-19) pandemic is within control, the film will be released on the coming Eid-ul-Fitr." The film was initially set to release on Eid al-Fitr on 2021. Subsequently, it was postponed due to the second wave of COVID-19 pandemic in Bangladesh. The film release date will be rescheduled, when the effects of the second wave of COVID-19 subside. Most recently he started shooting Bengal Multimedia's upcoming project Leader - Ami-e Bangladesh directed by Topu Khan (in his directorial debut), opposite Shabnom Bubly, (in their 12th collaboration), which began on 25 May 2021.

Other works

Film organizing
Shakib Khan elected the biennial election for the first time of Bangladesh Film Artists Association in 2011 and served as its president. Then he was re-elected in the 2015 election beating veteran actor Ahmed Sharif. It was the second time in a row that Khan has earned the position of the president in the association. Khan quoted that, "I am really happy to be reelected as the position has given me the opportunity to serve film artistes again."

Film produced
On 10 February 2014 Khan launched his own production company SK Films and produced Hero: The Superstar. After almost 5 years, the actor returned to produce in 2019 with the film Password under the banner of his own production company. Which is his second produced film in terms of release. Earlier in 2018, he started producing a film titled Priyotoma directed by Himel Ashraf. Shabnom Bubly is set to star opposite him in the film. However, the film was not released. It is currently being filmed. As of February 2020 he has produced three films. His latest produced film is BIR, which was released on the occasion of Valentine's Day in 2020. Earlier in 2019, he announced the production of four films together.

Stage performances
Shakib Khan has also performed on many stages as well as acting. On 24 February 2011, on the occasion of the 2011 Cricket World Cup he performed on stage at the Tri-nation Big Show with the participation of artists from the three host countries India, Sri Lanka and Bangladesh. On 14 November 2019, he performed on stage at the inaugural ceremony of 2019 T10 League at the Sheikh Zayed Cricket Stadium in Abu Dhabi, the capital of the United Arab Emirates, hosted by Indian production and distribution company Red Chillies Entertainment. Where he has to face criticism for speaking in Hindi language. On 11 December 2019, he performed the stage at the West Trimohoni Jhanjhara Club in Murshidabad, West Bengal, India, at a variety show called Srabanti and Shakib Khan Night organised to help distressed students and orphans, where popular Indian actress Srabanti Chatterjee performed on the stage with him. On 1 February 2020, he performed the stage at the Golden Jubilee celebrations to mark the 50th anniversary of Char Fashion Government College, where Riaz, Moushumi and Sadika Parvin Popy performed on stage with him. Speaker of the Jatiya Sangsad Shirin Sharmin Chaudhury, Chief Whip Nur-e Alam Chowdhury and Chairman of the Parliamentary Standing Committee of the Ministry of Youth and Sports Abdullah Al Islam Jacob were present as guests on the occasion.

TV commercials
Khan first performed in an advertisement called Asian Duplex City. Then in 2013 he worked in the advertisement of energy drink Power. In 2018, he performed in an advertisement of Banglalink, a mobile SIM service provider in Bangladesh, titled Beshi Beshi Khushi Kushi, where Shakib Khan and Nusraat Faria are seen together for the first time. In 2019, Khan starred in another commercial. He is seen as Hercules in this commercial for SMC Orsaline N directed by Adnan Al Rajib. In this regard Khan said, "I have worked with Adnan in an advertisement before it. That work has been appreciated by the audience. His thoughts are quite nice. Can find me in a completely different way. The audience will see the rest on the television screen." In April 2021, he done another commercial with the same company, directed by Piplu Khan. In the early September 2021, he participated in a TV commercials for Berger Paints Bangladesh Limited with actress Nusraat Faria.

In the media
Shakib Khan is widely regarded as one of the most popular and influential actors in Bengali cinema. He is often referred to as "King Khan", "King of Dhallywood" and "Number One Shakib Khan" (initialism as No1SK), also referred as "Bhaijaan of Dhallywood" (in reference to his 2018 film Bhaijaan Elo Re). , Khan has appeared in more than 240 Bangladeshi and West Bengal films in a career spanning almost two decade and described as one of the most successful actors in Bangladesh. Most of his films were commercially and critically successful. Khan is one of the most recognizable star of the present era of Bangladeshi film industry. As one of the most dominant actors in the Bangladeshi movie scene during the 2000s, 2010s and early 2020s, Khan is widely considered as one of the greatest and influential actors in the history of Bangladeshi cinema. He is critically acclaimed as one of the finest actors of Bangladesh.

In 2013, Khan became the brand ambassador of Bangladesh's energy drink Pran Power Energy Drink. It is the first time Khan has made his debut as an ambassador. Then, in the same year, he became the brand ambassador of Asian Duplex Town, a housing project of Asian Town Development Limited. Where he participated in its various promotional activities, including commercials, for one year. In March 2019, he was appointed as the brand ambassador of SMC Orsaline-N. He works to promote the product on special occasions. In the beginning of September 2021, he was appointed as the brand ambassador of Berger Paints Bangladesh Limited. For the next two years, he will participate in various campaigns, engagement sessions and other promotional activities on behalf of Berger Paints Bangladesh.

Khan was ranked for the first time as a Bangladeshi in the list of top 20 stars of the Calcutta Times Most Desirable Man in the 2019 edition by the Indian media The Times of Indias supplement Calcutta Times. The Calcutta Times ranked him 18th out of the top 20 stars, considering the business, audience demand and co-stars of the films released in India starring by him in 2018. He is among the most popular celebrities in Bangladesh. Khan's popularity has been recorded by both Google and YouTube as the most-searched-and-viewed actor several times. Also television channels hold film festivals every year on Eid with his films as Shakib Khan Films Festival.

Personal life
In 2008, a news article was published in Bhorer Kagoj stated that Shakib had married film actress Ratri. Shakib Khan denied the news of the marriage and threatened two journalists involved in publishing the news. They are said to have a son named Rahul. In 2022, Ratri claimed that Shakib distanced himself from her after his marriage to Apu Biswas. She also said that her son is now a mechanic and Shakib has not taken responsibility for their maintenance. However, she later denied the claim.

In 2006, Shakib Khan met Apu Biswas while costarring in Koti Takar Kabin (2006). He allegedly proposed to her in 2008 after completing the movie Kotha Dao Sathi Hobe. They were apparently married in a private wedding ceremony on 18 April 2008 at his Gulshan residence in Dhaka. However, the marriage was kept secret from the media and general public. In 2017, Apu Biswas informed in an interview on News24 that they were married. The couple has a son named Abraham Khan Joy, who was born on 27 September 2016 in a clinic in Kolkata, India.

On 22 November 2017, Shakib Khan filed for divorce and the couple got divorced on 22 February 2018. Apu had converted to Islam after her marriage with Shakib and took the name Apu Islam Khan, but she reportedly reverted to Hinduism after their divorce.

Shakib Khan and Shobnom Bubly were rumored to be dating while shooting for the film Bossgiri in 2016. There were strong rumours that they are married but the news was unconfirmed. On 26 September 2022, Bubly posted photos on Facebook which showed her with a baby bump. Incidentally, it was the birthday of Shakib's son Joy. On 30 September 2022, Shakib and Bubly both confirmed on Facebook that they have been married since 2018 and together they have a son named Shehzad Khan Bir who was born on 21 March 2020, in the United States.

He has also done some philanthropic work, such as supporting the Rana Plaza cause. Khan also owns a restaurant chain at Jamuna Future Park in Dhaka named Red Chicken. He has been one of the country's highest taxpayers for three consecutive years in 2016–17, 2018–19 and 2019–20. In the mid of 2019, Khan installed digital machine in 200 theaters across the country. The work of installing these under the name of SK Big Screen started from Eid al-Adha in 2019. The decision also created some controversy with Jaaz Multimedia, one of the country's leading production companies.

Political views
Shakib Khan was supposed to participate in the Eleventh Parliamentary Election of Bangladesh in 2018. On 10 November 2018, he said that he would buy the nomination papers for Bangladesh Awami League on 11 November. However, he changed his mind that night and stated that, he was not voting. He stated that, "It is not right for mine to leave cinema and be busy with anything else right now. It is possible to serve the country through cinema. So I decided not to take part in the election after discussing with my close ones." Then he wants to vote for the Nouka symbol in favor of Bangladesh Awami League in a video message in the same election. He praised prime minister Sheikh Hasina in that one minute video message. Khan referred to her as a Loving Mother and a Symbol of Development.

Illness
Shakib Khan faced the first major illness in 2008, at that time he had to go to Thailand for treatment. Since then his illness has been a cause for concern for filmmakers. Currently he consults a physician regularly. On 15 May 2015, Khan felt physically ill due to abdominal pain caused by acidity. Then on 17 May, he received first aid at LabAid Hospital in Dhaka under professor Dr. Salimur Rahman and rested as advised. He was taken to LabAid Hospital again on 25 May as he fell ill again. Later, as his physical condition deteriorated he left for Singapore on 26 May 2015 for advanced treatment. Khan returned to Dhaka on 31 May 2015, after receiving treatment at Mount Elizabeth Hospital in Singapore under Dr. Yo Sing Kong. On 13 April 2017, Khan fell ill with chest and neck pain and was admitted to Lab Aid Hospital in Dhaka for treatment. There he received treatment under Professor Abdul Wadud Chowdhury, a gastroliver specialist. In January 2018, he was admitted to the emergency department of Sydney Hospital in Australia due to a high fever during the filming of the Super Hero and received treatment for two days. On 28 December 2019, he was re-admitted to Labaid Hospital in Dhaka due to cold fever and gastric problems during the filming of Bir. The film work has been stopped for about a week due to his illness.

Impact and recognition 
In an interview veteran actor and producer Farooque said, "Shakib is a skilled actor. To say he has held the helm of the industry alone for a long time." After the watching film Shikari, Ranjit Mallick wrote in a tweet that, "Shakib's performance impressed me. It was not difficult to understand after watching the film Shikari that he is a great actor. I wish his success." Sabyasachi Chakrabarty said, "Shakib is incomparable as a man as he is polite and amiable as an actor." In another interview with Siti Cinema, he also praised Khan's acting as well as his personality.

In an interview with Channel i, Bangladeshi actor Misha Sawdagar said that "he is a perfect actor." In an interview with Channel i veteran actor Alamgir said, "Shakib Khan is a very talented actor." In an interview actress Nuton said, "Shakib Khan is a very good actor. Not only the actor but he is a perfect hero in all respects." After he surprised notable Bangladeshi singer and composer Runa Laila on her birthday, she praised his acting as well as his personality and wishes his success, she said, "I always think that Shakib is a very good actor. If he is allowed to play a different characters with a better directors, he will do much better. I know very well about his talent."

Controversies

2015: Protests against Bollywood films
In 2015, films by Shakib Khan was banned from being screened for the first time by Bangladesh Motion Picture Exhibitors Association after he led protests against the first screening after decades of a Bollywood film in Bangladesh. The Bollywood blockbuster film Wanted opened in cinemas on 23 January 2015 after Bangladesh's censor board cleared its nationwide release, following a 50-year ban on Hindi-language films.

But the screenings sparked protests outside cinemas along with wildcat strikes by hundreds of Dhallywood actors, directors and others, who said the release would cripple the local film industry, known as Dhallywood.

2017: Indefinitely banned by film organizations 
On 10 April 2017 actress Apu Biswas informed about his secret marriage with Khan and their children at live show on News24. In response to an interview in a national newspaper on 16 April, Khan said, "As more films are not being produced now, the number of employed people is little higher. Many directors will be seen in the list of directors' associations. They are chatting at the BFDC. But how many are working.? Same situation for artists and producers." Bangladesh Film Directors Association became angry over Khan's speech and was criticised in the film associations. Following that on 29 April 2017, Khan was banned from Bangladesh films for indefinitely, along with 12 film organisations including the Bangladesh Film Directors Association. The ban notice was signed by Bangladesh Film Director's Association president Mushfiqur Rahman Gulzar and secretary general Badiul Alam Khokon states that, "The Bangladesh Film Director's Association held a joint meeting with the president and general secretary of all the film-related organizations. It was decided to unanimously that, as Shakib Khan has spoken in the media including the national newspapers, disrespecting and humiliating the entire film directors of the country. Even now he is giving similar statements. All the film-related crew seem to think that Shakib has despised the film-related professionals of the country. Because the director is the Captain of the Ship. To insult them means to insult all the crews. Therefore, from today (Saturday) all members of the film-related organizations will not participate in the shooting and dubbing of any films with Shakib Khan for indefinitely."

In a response to the ban on the film, Shakib Khan stated that, "It is nothing but more a conspiracy against mine. Kazi Hayat sir, Faruk sir, Bapparaj sir have spoken about the issue. But the directors association made a decision without hearing anything, which was nothing but a personal anger."

Although, all of film organizations have faced criticism for this controversial decision.

The next day he came to the office of the Bangladesh Film Directors' Association and expressed his sorrow and apology. As a result, the indefinitely ban by 12 organizations, including Bangladesh Film Directors' Association was lifted from him on 1 May 2017.

2017: Defamation and fraud lawsuit 
On 2017, Shakib Khan was sued with fraud and defamation of 5 million for using the personal mobile number of a man named Ijazul Mia of Habiganj, Bangladesh, in a dialogue for the film Rajneeti. The film's director Bulbul Biswas and producer Ashfaq Ahmed were also charged in the same case. Autorickshaw driver Ijazul Mia filed the case in Habiganj Senior Judicial Magistrate's Court in Habiganj on 29 October 2016.

Ijazul Mia mentioned in the charge sheet of the case that, actress Apu Biswas said while giving a dialogue in a sequence of the film Rajneeti (26 minutes and 12 seconds of the film), 'I will not let go of my dream prince again and again.' In reply actor Shakib Khan said, 'I will never leave you, my princess.' Apu Biswas said again, 'How do you know that my Facebook ID is "Rajkumari"?' In reply Shakib Khan said, 'As you know, my mobile number is....'.

Regarding the case Khan stated, "As an artist I just delivered my dialogue. It is not my responsibility to decide whose mobile phone number it is, whether the number is correct or not. It does not come under my jurisdiction. It's the matter of the film's producer, director and scriptwriter. It turns on them. If any other hero in my place had delivered the dialogue, he had nothing to do."

2019: Criticism over commts 
On 27 May 2019, Shakib Khan claimed a doctorate in film at the founding anniversary of a fashion house called Prem's Collection as the part of promotion of the film Password and said he can make international quality films in the Sundarbans as well. The video of his remarks spread on social media, sparking widespread discussion and criticism. Many criticized him and made various humorous comments, statuses and videos. Khan said about his comments, "Many have did not understand my of comments, the way I actually wanted to explain. I mean, while I love making films, I also have a lot of experience. In that sense I have called myself a doctorate. Despite thousands of adversities, I am ready to make films. I meant it."

On the other hand, the director of the film Malek Afsari said about Khan's statements that, "The Sundarbans is a jungle, there are no five star hotels. As long as I stay, I have to trouble. This is what he meant that, even if leave me in the Sundarbans, I can make international quality films."

2019: Legal notice by Shapla Media 
On 11 September 2019, film production company Shapla Media sent a legal notice to Khan for not completing the work of a film titled Ektu Prem Dharkar (now known as Bidrohi) on time. In addition to sending the notice to Khan, a copy was also sent to the Ministry of Information, the Secretariat and the private secretary to the Prime Minister, Bangladesh Film Producers, Distributors, Directors and Artists associations.

Khan told The Daily Star about the allegations, "I will definitely finish the rest of the work on the film. I also set aside a few days for this. I don't have received any complaint. I don't want to say more anything about this."

2019: Penalty by RAJUK 
On 18 November 2019, A mobile court of RAJUK has finned Shakib Khan to 1 million with one year imprisonment for non-payment for illegally constructing an extended part of his house in Niketan, Gulshan, Dhaka without following the design approved by the Rajdhani Unnayan Kartripakkha (RAJUK).

2020: Song rights issue 
On 29 June 2020 Dilruba Khan, the original vocalist of a song titled "Pagol Mon" field a general diary (GD) against Shakib Khan and mobile phone service provider Robi Axiata Limited for allegedly violating copyright and digital security laws for using the first two lines of song "Pagol Mon" in the film Password released in 2019 without any official permission. Earlier on 28 June, Dilruba Khan had lodged a written complaint against Khan in the Cyber Crime Unit of Dhaka Metropolitan Police (DMP) demanding  in compensation.

2022: Sydney rape scandal 
On 1 October 2022, expatriate journalist Milli Sultana claimed that in 2018, Bangladeshi-born Australian Annie Submarine, who was a co-producer of one of his films, was raped by Shakib while filming Super Hero in Sydney. Annie filed a police complaint against him, but because of Shakib's lawyer's interference, the police could not take action against him. When Shakib was asked about this, he denied the allegation saying that Annie seduced him and what happened between them was consensual.

Awards and nominations

Khan has earned numerous accolades and become one of the most award-winning entertainers in Dhallywood with more than 30 awards including four National Film Awards, eight Meril Prothom Alo Awards, three Bachsas Awards and five CJFB Performance Awards. For the role of Surja, an independent young man in the family-drama film Bhalobaslei Ghor Bandha Jay Na (2010), he has received his first National Film Awards for Best Actor at the 35th National Film Awards in 2010. For role of Munna, a boy who deeply love his mother and got separated from his mother when he was quite young in the action drama film Khodar Pore Ma, he received his second National Film Awards for Best Actor in 2012. In 2015, he portrait as himself, a famous film star who later fall in love with a simple girl and committed suicide for her in the romantic drama Aro Bhalobashbo Tomay and earned him his third National Film Awards for Best Actor. For the role of Sabuj, a drugs addicted spoiled son of a rich man, who keeps himself out of society in romantic drama film Swatta (2017), he received his fourth National Film Awards for Best Actor.

He has won total eight Meril Prothom Alo Awards, which is the highest number of any male film actor. He received his first Meril Prothom Alo Awards for Best Actor for Amar Praner Swami for the role of Raju in 2007. In addition to this he won the award seven more times. In 2016, he portrait as Sultan alias Raghab, a disguised professional assassin with mysterious past, tasked with assassinating a top government official in the action thriller Shikari, he received his eighth Meril Prothom Alo Awards for Best Actor prior this he also earned a Tele Cine Awards for Best Actor (Bangladesh). Khan has also received an honoured as New Generation Actors at the fourth Cholochitra Mela in 2012.

See also
 Cinema of Bangladesh
 List of Bangladeshi actors

Footnotes

References

External links

 
 
 
 
 

1979 births
Living people
Bengali male actors
People from Dhaka
People from Gopalganj District, Bangladesh
21st-century Bangladeshi male singers
Bangladeshi playback singers
Bangladeshi male film actors
Male actors in Bengali cinema
Best Actor National Film Award (Bangladesh) winners
21st-century Bangladeshi male actors
Bangladeshi film producers
Bangladeshi Muslims
CJFB Performance Award Winners